Boehmeria is a genus of 47 species of flowering plants in the nettle family Urticaceae. Of the species, 33 are indigenous to the Old World and 14 to the New World; no species is indigenous to both the Old and New Worlds. The species include herbaceous perennials, shrubs and small trees. Although related to the similar-looking species of the stinging nettles of genus Urtica, species of Boehmeria do not have stinging hairs. Because of the similarity in appearance, some species are commonly called "false nettles".

This genus is named in honor of the German botanist, Georg Rudolf Boehmer.

Fossil record
14 fossil fruits of  †Boehmeria sibirica have been extracted from borehole samples of the Middle Miocene fresh water deposits in Nowy Sacz Basin, West Carpathians, Poland.

Cultivation and uses
One species, ramie (Boehmeria nivea) is an important fibre crop. Some are also used as ornamental plants.

Boehmeria species are used as food plants by the larvae of some Lepidoptera species including Bedellia boehmeriella, which feeds exclusively on B. grandis.

Species

New World species
The following species are found in the New World:
Boehmeria aspera Wedd. 1856
Boehmeria brevirostris Wedd. 1854
Boehmeria bullata Kunth 1817
 subsp. bullata Kunth 1817
 subsp. coriacea (Killip) Friis & Wilmot-Dear 1996
 subsp. notobullata Friis & Wilmot-Dear 1996
Boehmeria caudata Sw. 1788
Boehmeria celtidifolia Kunth 1817
Boehmeria cylindrica (L.) Sw. 1788
Boehmeria dolichostachys Friis & Wilmot-Dear 1996
Boehmeria excelsa (Bertero ex Steud.) Wedd. 1854
Boehmeria pavonii Wedd. 1854
Boehmeria radiata Burger 1975
Boehmeria ramiflora Jacq. 1760
Boehmeria repens (Griseb.) Wedd. 1869
Boehmeria ulmifolia Wedd. 1854

Old World species
The following species are found in the Old World:
Boehmeria beyeri C. B. Rob. 1911
Boehmeria clidemioides Miq. 1851
 var. clidemioides Miq. 1851
 var. diffusa (Wedd.) Hand.-Mazz. 1929
 var. umbrosa Hand.-Mazz. 1929
Boehmeria conica C.J.Chen, Wilmot-Dear & Friis 2003
Boehmeria densiflora Hook. & Arn. 1838
 var. boninensis (Nakai) Friis & Wilmot-Dear 2013
 var. densiflora Hook. & Arn. 1838
Boehmeria depauperata Wedd. 1854
Boehmeria didymogyne Wedd. 1869
Boehmeria grandis (Hook. & Arn.) A.Heller 1897
Boehmeria hamiltoniana Wedd. 1856
Boehmeria helferi Blume 1857
Boehmeria heterophylla Wedd. 1856
 var. blumei (Wedd.) Friis & Wilmot-Dear 2013
 var. heterophylla Wedd. 1856
Boehmeria holosericea Blume 1857
Boehmeria japonica (L.f.) Miq. 1867
 var. japonica (L.f.) Miq. 1867
 var. silvestrii (Pamp.) Friis & Wilmot-Dear 2013
 var. tenera (Blume) Friis & Wilmot-Dear 2013
Boehmeria kurzii Hook.f. 1888
Boehmeria lanceolata Ridl. 1911, nec 1910
Boehmeria leptostachya Friis & Wilmot-Dear 2010
Boehmeria listeri Friis & Wilmot-Dear 2010
Boehmeria manipurensis Friis & Wilmot-Dear 2010
Boehmeria multiflora C.B.Rob. 1908
Boehmeria nivea (L.) Hook f. & Arn. 1837
Boehmeria ourantha Miq. 1851
Boehmeria penduliflora Wedd. ex D.G.Long 1982
Boehmeria pilosiuscula (Blume) Hassk. 1844
 var. pilosiuscula (Blume) Hassk. 1844
 var. suffruticosa Acharya, Friis & Wilmot-Dear 2013
Boehmeria polystachya Wedd. 1856
Boehmeria rugosissima (Blume) Miq. 1851
Boehmeria sieboldiana Blume 1857
 var. sieboldiana Blume 1857
 var. fuzhouensis (W.T.Wang) Friis & Wilmot-Dear 2013
Boehmeria siamensis Craib 1916
Boehmeria splitgerbera Koidz. 1926
Boehmeria subintegra Friis & Wilmot-Dear 2010
Boehmeria ternifolia D.Don 1825
 var. ternifolia D.Don 1825
 var. kamley (Acharya & Yonek.) Friis & Wilmot-Dear 2013
Boehmeria tsaratananensis Leandri 1950
Boehmeria virgata (G.Forst.) Guill. 1837
 subsp. virgata (G.Forst.) Guill. 1837
 var. virgata (G.Forst.) Guill. 1837
 var. velutina Friis & Wilmot-Dear 2013
 var. maxima Friis & Wilmot-Dear 2013
 var. austroqueenslandica (Domin) Friis & Wilmot-Dear 2013
 subsp. macrophylla (Hornem.) Friis & Wilmot-Dear 2013
 var. macrophylla (Hornem.) Friis & Wilmot-Dear 2013
 var. molliuscula (Blume) Friis & Wilmot-Dear 2013
 var. tomentosa (Wedd.) Friis & Wilmot-Dear 2013
 var. macrostachya (Wight) Friis & Wilmot-Dear 2013
 var. longissima (Hook.f.) Friis & Wilmot-Dear 2013
 var. canescens (Wedd.) Friis & Wilmot-Dear 2013
 var. rotundifolia (D.Don) Friis & Wilmot-Dear 2013
 var. minuticymosa Acharya, Friis & Wilmot-Dear 2013
 var. scabrella (Roxb.) Friis & Wilmot-Dear 2013
 var. sumatrana (Miq.) Friis & Wilmot-Dear 2013
 var. densiglomerata (W.T.Wang) Friis & Wilmot-Dear 2013
 var. strigosa (W.T.Wang) Friis & Wilmot-Dear 2013
Boehmeria yaeyamensis Hatus. 1979
Boehmeria zollingeriana Wedd. 1854
 var. podocarpa (W.T.Wang) W.T.Wang & C.J.Chen 2003
 var. zollingeriana Wedd. 1854

Synonyms
The following names have been synonymized:
Boehmeria calophleba C. Moore & F. Muell. 1872 is a synonym of Pouzolzia australis (Endl.) Friis & Wilmot-Dear 2004.
Boehmeria glomerulifera Miq. 1854 is a synonym of Boehmeria depauperata Wedd. 1854.
Boehmeria jamaicensis Urb. 1907 is a synonym of Boehmeria ramiflora Jacq. 1760.
Boehmeria macrophylla Hornem. 1815 is a synonym of Boehmeria virgata (G.Forst.) Guill. 1837.
Boehmeria platyphylla Buch.-Ham. ex D. Don 1825 is a synonym of Boehmeria virgata (G.Forst.) Guill. 1837.

References

External links 

 Jepson Manual Treatment

 
Urticaceae genera
Taxa named by Nikolaus Joseph von Jacquin